Mpindela Abednego Mazibuko is a member of Ladysmith Black Mambazo, a South African choral group founded in 1960 - and still led - by his cousin Joseph.

Abednego was born in Ladysmith, South Africa, and was the youngest of six sons; the others being Albert, Milton, Funokwakhe, Mehlo, and   Ngali Mazibuko. Abednego joined the group in 1974 as a bass singer. whilst Walter Malinga  left the lineup in 1972

After the death of his brother Milton in 1984 after the Ibhayibheli Liyindlela album , Abednego remained in the line-up with Albert and has been a full-time member of the group since the early 1980s.

References

Ladysmith Black Mambazo members
21st-century South African male singers
People from Ladysmith, KwaZulu-Natal
Living people
1954 births
20th-century South African male singers